Love! Valour! Compassion! is a 1997 drama film directed by Joe Mantello and written by Terrence McNally, adapted from McNally's play of the same name. It revolves around eight gay men who gather for three summer weekends at a lakeside house in Dutchess County, New York, where they relax, reflect, and plan for survival in an era plagued by AIDS.

As with many screen adaptations of stage plays, the script underwent numerous changes, eliminating almost all direct addresses to the audience and the conclusion of one of the subplots. Mantello was nominated for the Grand Special Prize at the Deauville Film Festival.

Synopsis 
The story of eight gay male friends who spend the three major holiday weekends of one summer (Memorial Day, the Fourth of July, and Labor Day) together at a lakeside house in Dutchess County, New York in the mid 1990s. The house belongs to Gregory, a successful Broadway choreographer now approaching middle age, who fears he is losing his creativity, and his twenty-something lover Bobby, a legal assistant who is blind. Each of the guests at their house is connected to Gregory's work in one way or another. Arthur and his longtime partner Perry are business consultants; John Jeckyll, a sour and promiscuous Englishman, is a dance accompanist; and die-hard musical theater fanatic Buzz Hauser is a costume designer and the most stereotypically gay man in the group. Only John's summer lover Ramon and twin brother James are outside the circle of friends. Ramon is outgoing and eventually makes a place for himself in the group, while James is such a gentle soul that he is quickly welcomed. Infidelity, flirting, AIDS, skinny-dipping, truth-telling, and soul-searching mix questions about life and death with a dress rehearsal for Swan Lake performed in drag.

Cast 
In this film adaptation, McNally reunited the original cast, with the exceptions of Nathan Lane and Anthony Heald. Jason Alexander stepped in for Lane and Stephen Spinella replaced Heald.

Reception
Rotten Tomatoes gives the film a rating of 71% from 24 reviews.

Further reading

References

External links 
 
 
 
 

1997 films
HIV/AIDS in American films
American films based on plays
Films with screenplays by Terrence McNally
1997 drama films
1997 LGBT-related films
American drama films
American LGBT-related films
Films set in New York (state)
Gay-related films
1997 directorial debut films
1990s English-language films
1990s American films

sh:Love! Valour! Compassion!